Kati Marton (born April 3, 1949) is a Hungarian-American author and journalist. Her career has included reporting for ABC News as a foreign correspondent and National Public Radio, where she started as a production assistant in 1971, as well as print journalism and writing a number of books.

She is a former chairwoman of the International Women's Health Coalition, and a director (former chairwoman) of the Committee to Protect Journalists and other bodies including the International Rescue Committee, Human Rights Watch, and the New America Foundation.

Biography

Early life 
Marton was born in Budapest, Hungary, the daughter of UPI reporter Ilona Marton and award-winning Associated Press reporter Endre Marton. Her parents survived the Holocaust of World War II but never spoke about it.  They served nearly two years in prison on false charges of espionage for the U.S., and Kati and her older sister were placed in the care of strangers.  Raised a Roman Catholic, she learned much later, and by accident, that her grandparents were Jews, who were murdered at the Auschwitz concentration camp. Among the many honors her parents received for their reporting on the Hungarian Revolution of 1956 was the George Polk Award. The family fled Hungary following the revolution and settled in Chevy Chase, Maryland, where Marton attended Bethesda-Chevy Chase High School.

Education 
Marton studied at Wells College, Aurora, New York,  the Sorbonne and the Institut d'Études Politiques in Paris. Growing up in Hungary, she had a French nanny, so she was raised speaking both Hungarian and French, learning American English when her family moved to the U.S. She has a master's degree in International Relations from George Washington University.

Personal life 
Marton has been married three times. She was first married to Carroll Wetzel, a retired international investment banker from Philadelphia, in the early 1970s. Her second husband was ABC News anchor Peter Jennings; Jennings and Marton had two children together, Elizabeth and Christopher, before divorcing in 1993.

Her third husband was diplomat Richard Holbrooke, from 1995 until his death in December 2010, frequently traveling with him during his diplomatic missions in the former Yugoslavia and in the Middle East. She wrote about their love and recovering from his death in her 2012 memoir Paris: A Love Story.

Awards 
Marton has received several honors for her reporting, including the 2001 Rebekah Kohut Humanitarian Award by the National Council of Jewish Women, the 2002 Matrix Award for Women Who Change the World, the George Foster Peabody Award (presented to WCAU-TV, Philadelphia, in 1973), and the Commander's Cross of the Order of Merit of the Republic of Hungary—the country's highest civilian honor. She is also a recipient of The International Center in New York's Award of Excellence. Her book, Enemies of the People: My Family's Journey to America, was an autobiography finalist for the National Book Critics Circle Award in 2009.

Selected writing

References

External links 

Kati Marton at Simon & Schuster

Acceptance speech for the Leo Nevas Human Rights Award, United Nations Association of the United States of America
Kati Marton Marcia Franklin talks with author Kati Marton. Produced by Idaho Public Television

American women writers
Hungarian women writers
Elliott School of International Affairs alumni
University of Paris alumni
Jewish American writers
Hungarian emigrants to the United States
American people of Hungarian-Jewish descent
Hungarian Jews
Writers from Budapest
Living people
People from Chevy Chase, Maryland
Bard College faculty
1949 births
Wells College alumni
Commander's Crosses with Star of the Order of Merit of the Republic of Hungary (civil)
Bethesda-Chevy Chase High School alumni